Saathoff is a surname. Notable people with the surname include:

 Adam Saathoff (born 1975), American sport shooter
 Johann Saathoff (born 1967), German politician